Philip Waruinge (3 February 1945 – 19 October 2022) was a Kenyan professional boxer, who competed in the featherweight division (– 57 kg) during his career as an amateur.

Personal life
Philip Waruinge was born on 3 February 1945 in Murang'a, Kenya. He died in Nakuru on 19 October 2022, at the age of 77.

Career

Amateur career
Waruinge represented his native country at three consecutive Summer Olympics, starting in 1964.  He won the bronze medal in Mexico City, Mexico (1968) losing 2:3 to local Antonio Roldan and was awarded the Val Barker Trophy for Outstanding Boxer at the 1968 Olympic Games.

Waruinge captured the silver in 1972 in Munich, West Germany.

1972 Olympics
Below are the results of Philip Waruinge, a Kenyan featherweight boxer who competed at the 1972 Munich Olympics:

 Round of 64: bye
 Round of 32: defeated Jabbar Feli (Iran) by decision, 4-1
 Round of 16: defeated Salah Mohamed Amin (Egypt) by decision, 5-0
 Quarterfinal: defeated Jacko Lindberg (Finland) by decision, 4-1
 Semifinal: defeated Clemente Rojas (Colombia) by decision, 3-2
 Final: lost to Boris Kuznetsov (Soviet Union) by decision, 2-3 (was awarded silver medal)

Professional career
Waruinge turned professional in 1973 as a super bantamweight and had limited success.  He fought largely in Japan. In 1976 Waruinge landed a shot at WBC Bantamweight titleholder Carlos Zarate.  Waruinge was outclassed and was knocked out in the fourth round.  He retired after a loss two years later having competed in 25 professional bouts.  He won 14, lost 10, and drew 1.

References

External links
 
 Olympic results 1968
 databaseOlympics

1945 births
2022 deaths
Featherweight boxers
Olympic boxers of Kenya
Boxers at the 1964 Summer Olympics
Boxers at the 1968 Summer Olympics
Boxers at the 1972 Summer Olympics
Olympic silver medalists for Kenya
Olympic bronze medalists for Kenya
Boxers at the 1962 British Empire and Commonwealth Games
Boxers at the 1966 British Empire and Commonwealth Games
Boxers at the 1970 British Commonwealth Games
Commonwealth Games gold medallists for Kenya
Commonwealth Games bronze medallists for Kenya
Olympic medalists in boxing
Kenyan male boxers
Medalists at the 1972 Summer Olympics
Medalists at the 1968 Summer Olympics
Commonwealth Games medallists in boxing
African Games gold medalists for Kenya
African Games medalists in boxing
Boxers at the 1965 All-Africa Games
People from Murang'a
Medallists at the 1962 British Empire and Commonwealth Games
Medallists at the 1966 British Empire and Commonwealth Games
Medallists at the 1970 British Commonwealth Games